It Ain't Easy is a 1971 album by Long John Baldry. It marked his return to the edgier blues sound that he performed in the mid-60s. It was Baldry's fifth solo album.

Background
According to extensive notes about Long John Baldry's career in the re-release 2005 CD, Rod Stewart was brought on board to produce It Ain't Easy for Warner Brothers. Soon after in 1970, Stewart met Baldry’s former Bluesology bandmate Elton John at a party and the piano player joined on, too. Stewart and John each produced half of this bluesy album, with John contributing much of the piano work. Stewart brought in mate Ronnie Wood to play guitar, as well as many others who would appear on Stewart's Every Picture Tells a Story, released later in 1971.

The Baldry album features his biggest U.S. hit, "Don't Try to Lay No Boogie-Woogie on the King of Rock and Roll"; Baldry once noted how Stewart's loose and late-night recording sessions affected the tracks, "especially those recorded on my thirtieth birthday when he showed up with cases of Remy Martin cognac and several measures of good quality champagne!" Baldry points out that "Don't Try to Lay No Boogie-Woogie on the King of Rock and Roll" was recorded "whilst  on the floor".

The 1971 release also features "Black Girl", an American folk song most associated with Lead Belly, though covered by the likes of Bob Dylan, the Grateful Dead, Dolly Parton and Nirvana. Baldry does a version singing with Maggie Bell, who also appeared on Every Picture Tells a Story.

It Ain't Easy also includes Willie Dixon's song "I'm Ready" and an Elton John-Bernie Taupin song, "Rock Me When He's Gone".

Baldry and Stewart put a band together to promote the album on Baldry's first tour of the US, consisting of mostly musicians from Stewart's Every Picture Tells a Story album: Sam Mitchell (blues guitar), Micky Waller (drums), Pete Sears (bass) and Ian Armit (piano). They were called "The Long John Baldry Blues Band", and played two tours of the US.

Track listing
"Intro: Conditional Discharge" (John Baldry, Ian Armit) – 3:15
"Don't Try to Lay No Boogie-Woogie on the King of Rock and Roll" (Jeff Thomas) – 3:26
"Black Girl" (Traditional, Lead Belly) – 2:50
"It Ain't Easy" (Ron Davies) – 4:52
"Morning, Morning" (Tuli Kupferberg) – 2:38
"I'm Ready" (Willie Dixon) – 4:15
"Let's Burn Down the Cornfield" (Randy Newman) – 4:12
"Mr. Rubin" (Lesley Duncan) – 4:00 
"Rock Me When He's Gone" (Elton John, Bernie Taupin) – 5:01
"Flying" (Ronnie Wood, Rod Stewart, Ronnie Lane) – 6:50
Tracks 1-6 recorded at Morgan Studios; January 15, 17, 27 and 29; February 4, 1971
Tracks 7-10 recorded at IBC Studios; February 1, 3, 4, 10 and 11, 1971

2005 Re-issue bonus tracks:

 "Goin' Down Slow"
 "Blues (Corn Bread, Meat and Molasses)"
 "Love In Vain"
 "Midnight Hour Blues"
 "Black Girl" (alternate take)
 "It Ain't Easy" (alternate take)
 "I'm Ready" (alternate take)

Personnel
 Long John Baldry – vocals, 12-string guitar (track 3)
 Maggie Bell – vocals (tracks 3, 4)
 Elton John – organ, piano (tracks 8-10)
 Ron Wood – guitar (tracks 2, 4, 6), 12-string guitar (track 5)
 Alan Skidmore – tenor saxophone (track 2)
 Lesley Duncan, Tony Hazzard, Doris Troy, Tony Burrows, Roger Cook, Madeline Bell, Kay Garner, Liza Strike – backing vocals (tracks 2, 9-10)
 Sam Mitchell – dobro, (tracks 3-4) guitar, (tracks 2, 5-6) slide guitar (track 6)
 Ian Armit – piano (tracks 1-6)
 Ricky Brown – bass guitar (tracks 2-6)
 David Glover – bass guitar (tracks 7-10)
 Mick Waller – drums (tracks 2-6)
 Roger Pope – drums (tracks 7-10)
 Caleb Quaye – guitar (tracks 7-10)
 Ray Jackson – mandolin (tracks 3, 5)
 Joshua M'Bopo – guitar (tracks 7-10)
 Madeline Bell – tambourine (track 9) 
 Lesley Duncan – chorus caster [choirmistress] (tracks 2, 9-10)

Technical
 Rod Stewart – producer (tracks 1-6)
 Elton John – producer (tracks 7-10)
 Jimmy Horowitz – executive producer
 Ed Thrasher – art director
 Judith Sims – liner notes

References

Long John Baldry albums
1971 albums
Warner Records albums
Albums produced by Rod Stewart
Albums produced by Elton John
Albums recorded at IBC Studios
Albums recorded at Morgan Sound Studios